Filston Mawana (born 21 March 2000) is a Swedish footballer who plays as a forward for Åtvidabergs FF.

Early life
Mawana was born in Democratic Republic of the Congo, but moved to Sweden and the city of Malmö together with his family in 2006.

Career

Youth years
He started to play football with local club Malmö FF, and was first called up to the Swedish national under 17-team in 2015.

In December 2016, Mawana transferred to 1899 Hoffenheim, signing a four and half-year contract. He impressed in the youth system of the Bundesliga club and in 2017 The Guardian rated him as one of the 60 most promising football players in Europe born in 2000. Reportedly, Mawana attracted interest from clubs like Bayern Munich, Arsenal, Chelsea and Juventus.

He made his senior debut for 1899 Hoffenheim II in the Regionalliga Südwest on 12 May 2018, coming on as a substitute in a 3–0 win against VfB Stuttgart II. However, Mawana suffered a serious cruciate ligament injury during a training session the following summer.

Hammarby
On 19 March 2019, Mawana returned to Sweden, signing a three-year contract with Hammarby IF. He spent the first half of the season nursing his knee injury, but made his competitive debut for Hammarby on 21 August, coming on as a substitute in a 3–1 away win against IFK Luleå in the Svenska Cupen. During the fall of 2019, he went out on loan to IK Frej in Superettan, Sweden's second tier. Mawana scored a brace, his first senior goals, for the club in a 3–0 win against Syrianska FC on 14 September.

Åtvidabergs FF
On 17 February 2022, Mawana joined Åtvidabergs FF in Ettan, Sweden's third tier, after terminating his contract with Hammarby following three seasons plagued by injuries.

Career statistics

Club

References

External links

2000 births
Living people
Association football forwards
Swedish footballers
Sweden youth international footballers
Superettan players
Ettan Fotboll players
Malmö FF players
TSG 1899 Hoffenheim players
IK Frej players
Hammarby Fotboll players
Hammarby Talang FF players
Åtvidabergs FF players
Democratic Republic of the Congo emigrants to Sweden
Swedish people of Democratic Republic of the Congo descent